Symphionema paludosum  is a plant in the family Proteaceae.  It is endemic to New South Wales in eastern Australia. It is one of the many species authored by Robert Brown.

Description
It forms a sparsely stemmed, herbaceous subshrub growing usually to 30–50 cm, occasionally to 75 cm tall. Its leaves are trifoliate and 10–30 mm long. Its flowers are borne as spiky, pale yellow inflorescences. The fruits are oblong and about 2 mm long.

Distribution and habitat
The plant is found in swampy heath habitats. It occurs discontinuously in coastal areas from just north of Port Macquarie southwards to the Victorian border, as well as on the escarpment from Kanangra Tops to the Budawang Range.

References

External links

paludosum
Flora of New South Wales
Endemic flora of Australia